The West Voe of Sumburgh,, is the most southerly bay on the Shetland Mainland, located between Sumburgh Head, and the point of Scat Ness.

On the west side of the voe is the settlement of Scatness, while on the east side is the famous Jarlshof archaeological site. There are Late Mesolithic and Early Neolithic remains at West Voe.

Across the opening of the voe, past Sumburgh Head, is the tidal stream known as the Sumburgh Roost.

Sources

 This article is based on http://shetlopedia.com/West_Voe_of_Sumburgh a GFDL wiki.

Voes of Shetland